Fairyland is a 2023 American coming-of-age drama film written and directed by Andrew Durham in his directorial debut.  It is based on Alysia Abbott's memoir Fairyland: A Memoir of My Father. The film stars Emilia Jones, Scoot McNairy, Geena Davis, Cody Fern, Adam Lambert and Maria Bakalova.

Fairyland premiered on January 20, 2023 at the 2023 Sundance Film Festival.

Premise
Arriving in San Francisco very little, just after the death of her mother in a car accident in 1973, Alysia Abbott is living with her father Steve Abbott, a poet and activist who comes out as gay. Steve’s bohemian lifestyle clashes with the expectations of being a parent from both the outside world and Alysia herself, who occasionally wishes for less of the independence her father gives her. Their bonds and duty to each other are tested in painful and sudden ways. Years later, she discovers a world of artists and writers, but also the effects of the HIV/AIDS in the United States|AIDS crisis when people around her contract the virus to which her father also falls victim.

Cast
 Emilia Jones as Alysia Abbott
 Nessa Dougherty as a younger Alysia Abbott
 Scoot McNairy as Steve Abbott
 Geena Davis as Munca
 Cody Fern as Eddie Body
 Bella Murphy as Yayne
 Adam Lambert as Charlie
 Ryan Thurston as Johnny
 Maria Bakalova as Paulette

Production
In 2013, it was reported that American Zoetrope had successfully attained the screen rights for Alysia Abbott's memoir Fairyland: A Memoir of My Father, and that Sofia Coppola would adapt the book with Andrew Durham. Coppola would also originally produce the film with her brother Roman Coppola. Durham later assumed the role of the film's sole writer and director while Coppola remained involved as a producer.

In June 2022, it was announced that production had wrapped with Emilia Jones, Scoot McNairy, Geena Davis, Adam Lambert, Cody Fern, Bella Murphy and Nessa Dougherty starring in an ensemble cast. In August 2022, Maria Bakalova was also revealed to be appearing in the film.

Release
It premiered on January 20, 2023 at the Sundance Film Festival.

Reception 
On review aggregator website Rotten Tomatoes, the film has an approval rating of 96% based on 27 reviews, with an average rating of 6.3/10. The critics consensus reads, "Drawing on one family's real-life experiences, the powerfully acted Fairyland pays poignant tribute to love and resilience in the face of adversity and tragedy." Metacritic, which uses a weighted average, assigned a score of 68 out of 100, based on 9 reviews indicating "generally favorable reviews".

References

External links
 

2020s English-language films
2023 independent films
American films based on actual events
Drama films based on actual events
Films scored by Michael Penn
Films set in San Francisco
HIV/AIDS in American films
Films set in the 1970s
Films set in the 1980s